Gunnar Werner (14 May 1915 – 3 February 1993) was a Swedish swimmer. He competed in the men's 4 × 200 metre freestyle relay at the 1936 Summer Olympics.

References

External links
 

1915 births
1993 deaths
Olympic swimmers of Sweden
Swimmers at the 1936 Summer Olympics
Swimmers from Stockholm
Swedish male freestyle swimmers